Uncial 0261 (in the Gregory-Aland numbering), is a Greek uncial manuscript of the New Testament. Palaeographically it has been assigned to the 5th century. The manuscript has survived in a very fragmentary condition.

Description 

The codex contains some parts of the Epistle to the Galatians 1:9-12,19-22; 4:25-31, on 2 parchment leaves (20 cm by 15 cm). The text is written in two columns per page, 25 lines per page, in uncial letters.

Currently it is dated by the INTF to the 5th century.

Text 

The text-type of this codex is mixed. Aland placed it in Category III.

Location 

Currently the codex is housed at the Berlin State Museums (P. 6791, 6792, 14043) in Berlin.

See also 

 List of New Testament uncials
 Textual criticism

References

Further reading 

 Kurt Treu, "Neue Neutestamentliche Fragmente der Berliner Papyrussammlung", APF 18 (Berlin: 1966), pp. 23-38.
 G.H.R. Horseley, "New Documents Illustrating Early Christianity" 2 (Macquarie University, 1982), pp. 125-140.

Greek New Testament uncials
5th-century biblical manuscripts